Love Starvation / Trombone is an EP from British singer-songwriter Nick Lowe. It is Lowe's second EP to feature the American surf rock band, Los Straitjackets, as his backing band. The EP was released on May 17, 2019 through Yep Roc Records. It reached #7 on Billboard's Americana/Folk Albums chart, #28 on the Independent Albums chart, and #31 on the Current Rock Albums chart.

Background and recording 
The majority of Love Starvation / Trombone was recorded in Woodstock, NY, during a short break from touring.

The tracks "Love Starvation," "Blue on Blue" and "Raincoat in the River" were recorded at Hidden Quarry Studios in Bearsville, NY by Tuck Nelson and Danny Blume. Additional recordings were conducted by Chris Fisher at Easter Island Productions in Brentwood, TN. "Trombone" was recorded at the Pow Wow Fun Room in Mar Vista, CA by Tuck Nelson and Los Straitjacket's bass player, Pete Curry. Additional recording took place at SkillsWest in Burbank, CA. The trombone on the track "Trombone" was played by Duane Benjamin and was arranged by Jimmy Vivino of Conan O’Brien’s Basic Cable Band.

Love Starvation / Trombone was mixed at Silver Shark Studios in Tooting Bec, London, UK, by Nick Lowe and Tuck Nelson. The EP was mastered by Tim Young at Metropolis in London.

Critical reception 

Rolling Stone premiered the track "Love Starvation" on February 25, 2019. Hank Shteamer began his article with a quote, "'That’s what’s really cool about a guy like Nick, that he’d agree to something like this,' Los Straitjackets guitarist Eddie Angel told Rolling Stone last year of the masked instrumental rockers’ ongoing collaboration with veteran singer-songwriter Nick Lowe. 'We had nothing to lose. But he did: his reputation!'"

On May 21, 2019 Love Starvation / Trombone was given a 7 out of 10 rating by the online publication, Electric Eye. The review ended with, "At 70, Nick Lowe has stopped playing the part of the Jesus of Cool. He no longer needs to proselytise: just like his music, Nick Lowe IS Cool."

Love Starvation/Trombone  was given an 8 out of 10 rating by Americana UK on May 21, 2019. Jim Finnie ended his review with, "Nick Lowe is a bit of national musical treasure and long may his enthusiasm and creativity continue."

NPR's Ken Tucker reviewed Love Starvation / Trombone during a segment on May 27, 2019. Tucker began with, "In their recent releases, Nick Lowe (along with Los Straitjackets) and Wreckless Eric have created new music that connects to old music without maudlin nostalgia or huffy defensiveness."

In a review for AllMusic, Stephen Thomas Erlewine says, "The second EP Nick Lowe recorded with Los Straitjackets within the course of a year, Love Starvation/Trombone does indeed play a bit like a genuine double-45 that its title suggests: the two main songs are paired with flipsides that are a bit lighter and mellower than the A-sides."

American Songwriter gave the EP a "3.5 out of 5 stars" rating. Hal Horowitz began his review with, "When Nick Lowe was addressing the audience about what they were about to hear at a show during his recent tour, he cautioned there would be a few new songs sprinkled into the set list. But, in typical self-deprecating Lowe fashion, he reassured the audience that a) they would be short and b) they sound just like the old songs anyway, so not to worry."

Track listing

Personnel 

 Nick Lowe: lead vocals, acoustic guitar, producer
 Eddie Angel: guitar 
Greg Townson: guitar
Pete Curry: bass
Chris Sprague: drums, backing vocals 
Tuck Nelson: mixing engineer
Duane Benjamin: trombone
Jimmy Vivino: arrangement for "Trombone"
Tim Young: mastering
Nils Schlebusch: front cover photo
Nathan Golub: illustration and package design 
Peta Waddington: art direction and aesthetics 
Danny Blume: recording on "Love Starvation", "Blue on Blue", and "Raincoat in the River"
*Personnel information taken from Love Starvation / Trombone liner notes.

References 

2019 EPs
Nick Lowe albums
Yep Roc Records EPs